Pendragon or  ((pen[n] dragon; composed of Welsh , 'head, chief, top' and  / dragon, 'dragon; warrior'; borrowed from the Latin word , plural , 'dragon[s]') literally means 'chief dragon' or 'head dragon', but in a figurative sense: 'chief leader', 'chief of warriors', 'commander-in-chief', or 'chief governor'), is the epithet of Uther, father of King Arthur in medieval and modern Arthurian literature and occasionally applied to historical Welsh heroes in medieval Welsh poetry, such as Rhodri ab Owain Gwynedd.

In the prose version of Robert de Boron's Merlin, the name of Uther's elder brother Ambrosius is given as Pendragon, while Uter (Uther) changes his name after his brother's death to Uterpendragon.

The use of "Pendragon" to refer to Arthur, rather than to Uther or his brother, is of much more recent vintage.  In literature, one of its earliest uses to refer to Arthur is in Alfred Tennyson's poem Lancelot and Elaine, where, however, it appears as Arthur's title rather than his surname, following contemporary speculation that "pendragon" had been a term for an ancient Welsh war-chief. In C. S. Lewis's 1945 novel That Hideous Strength, the Pendragon leads a national moral struggle through the centuries; bearers of the title include Cassibelaun, Uther, Arthur, and Elwin Ransom.

Mark Twain in A Connecticut Yankee in King Arthur's Court makes various satirical and scathing remarks about "The Pendragon Dynasty" which are in fact aimed at ridiculing much later British dynasties.
The story of The Pendragon Legend by Antal Szerb revolves around a Welsh noble family called Pendragon.

References

Arthurian characters
Legendary British kings